Storstrommen (meaning "Large Stream"), is one of the major glaciers in northeastern Greenland. 

It was named Storstrømmen because of its size by the ill-fated 1906–08 Denmark Expedition (Danmark-Ekspeditionen) led by Ludvig Mylius-Erichsen.

Geography 
The mighty Storstrommen is roughly north–south oriented and has a width of over 20 km. Queen Louise Land (Dronning Louise Land) lies to the west and Daniel Bruun Land to the east.

Flowing southwards for over 125 kilometers from the area of the Alabama Nunatak, its front is in the Bredebrae, the confluence of two very large glaciers, the Storstrommen flowing from the north and the almost equally large L. Bistrup Brae from the south. 

The Storstrommen is part of an extensive glacier system that includes as well the Kofoed-Hansen Glacier (Kofoed-Hansen Bræ) to the NE and the Borgjokel Glacier to the SW.

See also
List of glaciers in Greenland

References

External links
Weather in Storstrømmen (Greenland)
Captain Koch's Crossing of Greenland, Bulletin of the American Geographical Society, Vol. 46, No. 5 (1914), pp. 356-360
CHRONIQUE GÉOGRAPHIQUE (French)
Glaciers of Greenland

ceb:Storstrømmen (suba sa yelo)
sv:Storstrømmen (glaciär)